Trimethylenetetrathiafulvalenedithiolate (tmdt) is a ligand used in the making of metal organic electric conductors. It normally has a charge of −2. Known compounds include Ni(tmdt)2, Pt(tmdt)2, Pd(tmdt)2, Au(tmdt)2,

The tmdt2− ion is based on fulvalene, but with the four atoms adjacent to the bridging double bond replaced with sulfur yielding tetrathiafulvalene, at one end of the pair of rings is another five-member ring attached by adding three carbon atoms (the trimethylene part), and the other side of the fulvalene has two sulfur atoms, that bond to the metal ion.

Some of the sulfur atoms can be replaced by selenium to yield similar conducting compounds.

List

References

Sulfur heterocycles
Organic electronics
Anions
Ligands
Thiolates